The following radio stations broadcast on FM frequency 91.3 MHz:

Argentina
 LRS928 in Esperanza, Santa Fe
 Aire Libre in Rosario, Santa Fe
 Radio María in Buenos Aires
 Radio María in General La Madrid, Buenos Aires
 Radio María in Federación, Entre Ríos
 Radio María in Gualeguay, Entre Ríos
 Radio María in Urdinarrain, Entre Ríos
 Radio María in San Salvador de Jujuy, Jujuy
 Radio María in Río Turbio, Santa Cruz
 Radio María in Esperanza, Santa Fe

Australia
 3SRR in Mount Buller, Victoria
 2MAC in Sydney, New South Wales
 3PNN in Warrnambool, Victoria
 6WSM in Fremantle, Western Australia
 4NAG in Yeppoon, Queensland

Canada (Channel 217)

 CBD-FM in Saint John, New Brunswick
 CBF-FM-6 in Lac-Megantic, Quebec
 CBTO-FM in Revelstoke, British Columbia
 CBUS-FM in 100 Mile House, British Columbia
 CBXV-FM in Fox Creek, Alberta
 CFBW-FM in Hanover, Ontario
 CHRM-FM-1 in Les Mechins, Quebec
 CHRZ-FM in Parry Island, Ontario
 CIOG-FM in Charlottetown, Prince Edward Island
 CIRA-FM in Montreal, Quebec
 CJLX-FM in Belleville, Ontario
 CJTR-FM in Regina, Saskatchewan
 CJZN-FM in Victoria, British Columbia
 CKUA-FM-13 in Drumheller, Alberta
 VF2398 in Sundree, Alberta
 VF2490 in Campement Eastmain, Quebec

Malaysia
 Mix in Taping, Perak

Mexico

 XHACE-FM in Mazatlán, Sinaloa
 XHDGD-FM in Victoria de Durango (Ninguno), Durango
 XHEIM-FM in Saltillo, Coahuila
 XHEOB-FM in Pichucalco, Chiapas
 XHEPL-FM in Ciudad Cuauhtémoc, Chihuahua
 XHFAJ-FM in Mexico City
 XHMLS-FM in Matamoros, Tamaulipas
 XHMTM-FM in Montemorelos, Nuevo León
 XHNOE-FM in Nuevo Laredo, Tamaulipas
 XHPAMM-FM in Amatepec, State of Mexico
 XHPCHQ-FM in Chetumal, Quintana Roo
 XHPGSS-FM in Guasave, Sinaloa
 XHPLA-FM in Aguascalientes, Aguascalientes
 XHPT-FM in Córdoba, Veracruz
 XHPTAN-FM in Tantoyuca, Veracruz
 XHSCFM-FM in Cuilápam De Guerrero, Oaxaca
 XHSIAE-FM in Cuetzalan, Puebla
 XHSML-FM in San Miguel de Allende, Guanajuato
 XHSOT-FM in Soto la Marina, Tamaulipas
 XHTY-FM in Tecomán, Colima

Philippines
DWBA-FM in Santiago City, Isabela

Singapore
 One FM 91.3

United Kingdom
BBC Radio 3 at Wrotham, Kent
RAAJ FM in Sandwell

United States (Channel 217)

 KACW (FM) in South Bend, Washington
 KAHU in Pahala, Hawaii
 KAKO (FM) in Ada, Oklahoma
 KANP in Ashton, Idaho
 KANV in Olsburg, Kansas
 KAPC in Butte, Montana
 KAQD in Abilene, Texas
 KAWN in Winslow, Arizona
 KAXR in Arkansas City, Kansas
 KAYA in Hubbard, Nebraska
 KBCS in Bellevue, Washington
 KBIA in Columbia, Missouri
 KBKN in Lamesa, Texas
 KBSJ in Jackpot, Nevada
 KCED in Centralia, Washington
 KCPR in San Luis Obispo, California
 KDFR in Des Moines, Iowa
 KDKR in Decatur, Texas
 KDMC-FM in Van Buren, Missouri
 KDOX in Big Pine, California
 KDRH in King City, California
 KFLF in Somers, Montana
 KFRB in Bakersfield, California
 KGHR in Tuba City, Arizona
 KGLY in Tyler, Texas
 KGTS in College Place, Washington
 KGUY in Guymon, Oklahoma
 KHCK in Houck, Arizona
 KIDE in Hoopa, California
 KIOE in Utulei Village, American Samoa
 KISJ-LP in Bisbee, Arizona
 KKJD in Borrego Springs, California
 KLRY in Gypsum, Colorado
 KLXZ in Ruidoso, New Mexico
 KLZV in Brush, Colorado
 KMHA in Four Bears, North Dakota
 KMHS-FM in Coos Bay, Oregon
 KMSA in Grand Junction, Colorado
 KMSK in Austin, Minnesota
 KNBJ in Bemidji, Minnesota
 KNCM in Appleton, Minnesota
 KNCT-FM in Killeen, Texas
 KNIS in Carson City, Nevada
 KNVE in Redding, California
 KNYR in Yreka, California
 KOAB-FM in Bend, Oregon
 KOSW-LP in Ocean Shores, Washington
 KPAL in Palacios, Texas
 KPKO in Pecos, Texas
 KPRI in Pala, California
 KPVU in Prairie View, Texas
 KRSC-FM in Claremore, Oklahoma
 KRXG in Silver City, New Mexico
 KSCL in Shreveport, Louisiana
 KSHM in Show Low, Arizona
 KSTJ in Hartford, South Dakota
 KSUT in Ignacio, Colorado
 KSUW in Sheridan, Wyoming
 KSVY in Sonoma, California
 KTEQ-FM in Rapid City, South Dakota
 KTLX in Columbus, Nebraska
 KTPF in Salida, Colorado
 KUAF in Fayetteville, Arkansas
 KUCA (FM) in Conway, Arkansas
 KUOP in Stockton, California
 KUSF in Glendale, Oregon
 KUTU in Santa Clara, Utah
 KUWA in Afton, Wyoming
 KUWC in Casper, Wyoming
 KUWS in Superior, Wisconsin
 KUWT in Thermopolis, Wyoming
 KVFM in Beeville, Texas
 KVLU in Beaumont, Texas
 KWDS in Canadian, Texas
 KWTH in Barstow, California
 KWWM in Rock Springs, Wyoming
 KXCI in Tucson, Arizona
 KXRP in Bismarck, North Dakota
 KXWT in Odessa, Texas
 KYJC in Commerce, Texas
 KZBV in Carmel Valley, California
 KZES-FM in Estelline, Texas
 KZLV in Lytle, Texas
 WAKJ in DeFuniak Springs, Florida
 WAPS (FM) in Akron, Ohio
 WARN (FM) in Culpeper, Virginia
 WATY in Folkston, Georgia
 WBGP (FM) in Moultrie, Georgia
 WBNB in Equality, Alabama
 WBNY in Buffalo, New York
 WCDJ in Carbondale, Pennsylvania
 WCHW-FM in Bay City, Michigan
 WCKZ in Orland, Indiana
 WCNY-FM in Syracuse, New York
 WCPI in McMinnville, Tennessee
 WCQC in Clarksdale, Mississippi
 WCRD in Muncie, Indiana
 WCSG in Grand Rapids, Michigan
 WCUW in Worcester, Massachusetts
 WDJM-FM in Framingham, Massachusetts
 WDOM in Providence, Rhode Island
 WESM in Princess Anne, Maryland
 WEVH in Hanover, New Hampshire
 WFHB in Bloomington, Indiana
 WFIX in Florence, Alabama
 WFMR (FM) in Orleans, Massachusetts
 WFQS in Franklin, North Carolina
 WGBT in Tomahawk, Wisconsin
 WGJU in East Tawas, Michigan
 WGMR (FM) in Effingham, Illinois
 WGRC in Lewisburg, Pennsylvania
 WGTE-FM in Toledo, Ohio
 WHEM (FM) in Eau Claire, Wisconsin
 WHFG in Broussard, Louisiana
 WHGO in Hertford, North Carolina
 WHHI in Highland, Wisconsin
 WHIF in Palatka, Florida
 WHIL in Mobile, Alabama
 WHJE in Carmel, Indiana
 WHQR in Wilmington, North Carolina
 WIOX in Roxbury, New York
 WIPR-FM in San Juan, Puerto Rico
 WIUM in Macomb, Illinois
 WJCO in Montpelier, Indiana
 WJCZ in Milford, Illinois
 WJOG in Good Hart, Michigan
 WJTG in Fort Valley, Georgia
 WKMS-FM in Murray, Kentucky
 WKNH in Keene, New Hampshire
 WLCH in Lancaster, Pennsylvania
 WLFA in Asheville, North Carolina
 WLMU in Harrogate, Tennessee
 WLRN-FM in Miami, Florida
 WLTR in Columbia, South Carolina
 WLVR-FM in Bethlehem, Pennsylvania
 WMEW in Waterville, Maine
 WMLU in Farmville, Virginia
 WMPN-FM in Jackson, Mississippi
 WNDY (FM) in Crawfordsville, Indiana
 WNGB in Petersham, Massachusetts
 WNIW in La Salle, Illinois
 WNLS in Slidell, Louisiana
 WOES in Ovid-Elsie, Michigan
 WOLN in Olean, New York
 WOLR in Lake City, Florida
 WOUB-FM in Athens, Ohio
 WPAR in Salem, Virginia
 WPDQ in Scottsville, Kentucky
 WPFG in Carlisle, Pennsylvania
 WQLN-FM in Erie, Pennsylvania
 WRLI-FM in Southampton, New York
 WRMW in Peshtigo, Wisconsin
 WRSX in Port Huron, Michigan
 WRTQ in Ocean City, New Jersey
 WSEB in Englewood, Florida
 WSHL-FM in Easton, Massachusetts
 WSJA in York, Alabama
 WSJE in Summersville, West Virginia
 WSLE in Salem, Illinois
 WSTM (FM) in Kiel, Wisconsin
 WTBJ in Oxford, Alabama
 WTSR in Trenton, New Jersey
 WTZY in Wonder Lake, Illinois
 WUKY in Lexington, Kentucky
 WUNH in Durham, New Hampshire
 WVKR-FM in Poughkeepsie, New York
 WVOB in Dothan, Alabama
 WVST-FM in Petersburg, Virginia
 WVUD in Newark, Delaware
 WWDL in Plainfield, Indiana
 WWQI in Morristown, Indiana
 WWUH in West Hartford, Connecticut
 WXAC in Reading, Pennsylvania
 WXLH in Blue Mountain Lake, New York
 WXPL in Fitchburg, Massachusetts
 WXRI in Winston-Salem, North Carolina
 WYEP-FM in Pittsburgh, Pennsylvania
 WYFZ in Belleview, Florida
 WYSO in Yellow Springs, Ohio
 WZMB in Greenville, North Carolina

References

Lists of radio stations by frequency